Tim Prentice is a kinetic sculptor.  He received a master's degree in architecture from the Yale School of Architecture in 1960 and founded the award-winning company of Prentice & Chan in 1965.  He resides in Cornwall, Connecticut.

Ten years after forming Prentice & Chan, he established his studio in Cornwall to design and fabricate kinetic sculpture. His corporate clients include American Express, Bank of America, Citigroup, Mobil, AT&T and Hewlett-Packard. In the last few years he has completed installations in Japan, Korea, Northern Ireland, and Australia.  The lobby of Eleven Times Square features one of his kinetic mobile installations. One of his notable works include "Flashdance", at the Jacksonville International Airport, containing suspended kinetic elements that move in response to air currents generated by a moving escalator.

His work grows out of the tradition of Alexander Calder and George Rickey, but in a recent review the critic Grace Glueck stated that his work's 'gently assertive character is very much his own.' His works are on display at the Maxwell Davidson Gallery in New York City.

Book

 Drawing on the Air: The Kinetic Sculpture of Tim Prentice, (2012) Easton Studio Press

Public collections

 Westmoreland Museum of American Art

Residencies and workshops

 1991 Hotchkiss School, Lakeville, Connecticut
 1993 Groton School, Groton, Massachusetts
 2004 Pratt Museum, Homer, Alaska

Personal
 1949 Graduate of Brooks School, North Andover, MA
 1953-1960 Yale University, B.A., M. Arch
 1965-1975 Partner, Prentice & Chan Architects, New York, NY
 1968-1969 Member of MOMA Commission on Architecture and Design
 1973-1974 President, New York Chapter of the AIA
 1974-1976 President, Municipal Art Society, New York, NY
 1975-1989 Fellow, American Institute of Architects
 1975-1980 Adjunct Professor of Design, Columbia University, New York, NY
 1992-1995 Member, Board of Trustees, Saint-Gaudens Trust
 1995-1998 Member, Board of Trustees, Hartford Art School]

References

External links
 timprentice.com
 New York Times article
 https://web.archive.org/web/20130512184705/http://www.timprentice.com/images/Sculpture_March_2012.pdf

Year of birth missing (living people)
Living people
People from Cornwall, Connecticut
Yale School of Architecture alumni
20th-century American sculptors
Modern sculptors
University of Hartford people
21st-century American sculptors